Enoch Hoag (1812–1884) was an Indian Agent who was appointed Superintendent of the Central Superintendency in 1869 by President Ulysses S. Grant during his "Peace Policy".  His tenure ended after the election of Rutherford B. Hayes. The University of Oklahoma has a collection of his papers. Haverford College also has a collections of his papers.

He was a Quaker. Hoag was a member of the Iowa Yearly Meeting.

The Central Superintendency had responsibility for Indian affairs with various tribes in the areas including parts of what are now Kansas and Nebraska.
Letters to and from Hoag remain a resource for understanding the times.

Hoag helped communicate U.S. government interests in Kaw land.

References

1884 deaths
1812 births
United States Indian agents
American Quakers